Andrew Wheeler-Omiunu (born December first, 1994) is an American professional soccer player who plays as a midfielder for Forward Madison FC in USL League One.

College career
Wheeler-Omiunu attended Harvard University, where he played college soccer for four years, tallying four goals and six assists in 64 appearances for the Crimson.

While at college, Wheeler-Omiunu appeared for Premier Development League sides GPS Portland Phoenix and Seattle Sounders FC U-23.

Club career
On January 17, 2017, Wheeler-Omiunu was selected in the third round (46th overall) of the 2017 MLS SuperDraft by Atlanta United.
 He signed with the club on February 10, 2017.

On June 14, 2017, Wheeler-Omiunu made his professional debut as a 60th minute substitute during a 3–2 win over Charleston Battery in the Lamar Hunt U.S. Open Cup.

Wheeler-Omiunu made his professional debut for Atlanta United on March 31, 2018, coming on as a 74th minute substitution in a 1–0 win over Minnesota United.

Wheeler-Omiunu was released by Atlanta at the end of their 2018 season.

On January 30, 2019, Wheeler-Omiunu joined USL League One side FC Tucson.

After a season's stint with FC Tucson, Wheeler–Omiunu signed with Sacramento Republic for the 2020 season. On November 17, 2020, Sacramento exercised the option on Wheeler-Omiunu's contract, retaining him for the 2021 season. Wheeler-Omiunu was released by Sacramento following the 2021 season.

On January 12, 2022, Forward Madison FC announced that it had signed Wheeler-Omiunu to a contract for the 2022 season.

Personal life
Wheeler-Omiunu is of Nigerian descent through his father, David. He attended the Roxbury Latin School in West Roxbury, Massachusetts. An accredited vocalist performer, Wheeler-Omiunu has a penchant for R&B and acapella.

Honors 
Atlanta United
 MLS Cup: 2018

References

External links
 
 

1994 births
Living people
American sportspeople of Nigerian descent
American soccer players
Association football midfielders
Atlanta United FC draft picks
Atlanta United FC players
Atlanta United 2 players
GPS Portland Phoenix players
Harvard Crimson men's soccer players
Major League Soccer players
People from Bellingham, Massachusetts
Seattle Sounders FC U-23 players
Soccer players from Massachusetts
Sportspeople from Norfolk County, Massachusetts
FC Tucson players
Phoenix Rising FC players
Sacramento Republic FC players
USL Championship players
USL League Two players
USL League One players
Forward Madison FC players